Cagayan de Oro's 1st congressional district is one of the two congressional districts of the Philippines in Cagayan de Oro. It has been represented in the House of Representatives since 2007. It was created by the 2007 reapportionment that divided the city into two congressional districts and which took effect in the same year. The district is composed of all barangays located west of the Cagayan River and includes the city's southern barangays bordering the mountains of Talakag and Iligan. It is currently represented in the 19th Congress by Lordan Suan of Padayon Pilipino.

Representation history

Election results

2019

2016

2013

2010

See also
Legislative districts of Cagayan de Oro

References

Congressional districts of the Philippines
Politics of Cagayan de Oro
2007 establishments in the Philippines
Congressional districts of Northern Mindanao
Constituencies established in 2007